Beam Dormitory was the first permanent building at the American Lutheran Theological Southern Seminary in Columbia, South Carolina.  It was built on the highest point in Columbia in 1911 based on a design by noted Virginia architect Charles M. Robinson.  The structure was built by Wise Granite Co.  It included a chapel, housing, refectory, classrooms, and faculty offices.  Beam Hall is now used as a dormitory and also contains office suites, meeting rooms, and an exercise facility.  The building was listed on the National Register of Historic Places in 1979.

References

University and college buildings on the National Register of Historic Places in South Carolina
Buildings and structures in Columbia, South Carolina
Religious buildings and structures completed in 1911
National Register of Historic Places in Columbia, South Carolina
1911 establishments in South Carolina